In Greek mythology, Chione or Khionê (Ancient Greek: Χιονη from χιών – chiōn, "snow") may refer to the following women:

 Chione, daughter of Boreas and mother of Eumolpus by Poseidon.
 Chione, daughter of Daedalion, and mother of Philammon and Autolycus by Apollo and Hermes respectively. She may be the same with Philonis and Leuconoe.
 Chione, daughter of Callirrhoe, who was changed into a snow cloud.
 Chione, daughter of Arcturus, who was abducted by Boreas and bore him three sons.
 Chione, the naiad mother of Priapus by Dionysus.
 Chione, one of the Niobids.

Notes

References 

Conon, Fifty Narrations, surviving as one-paragraph summaries in the Bibliotheca (Library) of Photius, Patriarch of Constantinople translated from the Greek by Brady Kiesling. Online version at the Topos Text Project.
Gaius Julius Hyginus, Fabulae from The Myths of Hyginus translated and edited by Mary Grant. University of Kansas Publications in Humanistic Studies. Online version at the Topos Text Project.
Hesiod, Catalogue of Women from Homeric Hymns, Epic Cycle, Homerica translated by Evelyn-White, H G. Loeb Classical Library Volume 57. London: William Heinemann, 1914. Online version at theio.com
Maurus Servius Honoratus, In Vergilii carmina comentarii. Servii Grammatici qui feruntur in Vergilii carmina commentarii; recensuerunt Georgius Thilo et Hermannus Hagen. Georgius Thilo. Leipzig. B. G. Teubner. 1881. Online version at the Perseus Digital Library.
Publius Ovidius Naso, Metamorphoses translated by Brookes More (1859-1942). Boston, Cornhill Publishing Co. 1922. Online version at the Perseus Digital Library.
 Publius Ovidius Naso, Metamorphoses. Hugo Magnus. Gotha (Germany). Friedr. Andr. Perthes. 1892. Latin text available at the Perseus Digital Library.

Women of Apollo
Women in Greek mythology
Phocian characters in Greek mythology
Chione
Consorts of Dionysus